Balsi is a village in Kesinga Block Kalahandi district in the India state of Odisha, near the east coast of India.
This Village belongs to Odisha.

Abouts of Village 
Balsi is the Popular village positioned in Kesinga Block of Kalahandi district in Odisha. Positioned in rural area of Kalahandi district of Odisha, it is one among the 4 villages of Balsi Panchayat of Kalahandi district. As per the administration register, the village number of Balsi is 422360. The village has 510 homes.
According to Census 2011, Balsi's population is 3169. Out of this, 60% are males while the females count 40% here. This village has 254 kids in the age group of 0–6 years. Out of this 134 are boys and 120 are girls.

The Nearest Village of this Panchayat is

 Balsi
 Rengali
 Kokodmal
 Masanibandha

Geography
It has an average elevation of .Another landmark of Balsi is Kandadangar Hill (old mountain) at the Last of the Village. This mountain has a profound effect on the climate of Balsi.

Transport
Kandel Road Railway Station is the major railhead in Balsi Village. It is 12 km nearest considered as the gateway of Kalahandi.

National Highway 26 passes through the Kesinga. Balsi is well connected to major cities and towns in Odisha.

Economy
The Balsi Village is Famous for Peda and Khuaa.
Apart from being a railhead for the region, Kesinga also serves as the place of enormous business activity.  It is the economic heart of the surrounding area, where farmers can get a fair price for produce.  There are scores of rice mills in Kesinga.  A godown of FCI gives the storage facility for farmers and rice mill owners.

School and College in Balsi Area
Balsi High School, Balsi is the Purely oldest School in Balsi Panchayat & it is also known as JUVP, Balsi
The Nearest School of Balsi Panchayat
Government Girls High School Kesinga and Kesinga Vidyapitha Kesinga.

Nearest College in Balsi Panchayat

Kesinga Mahavidyalaya, Kesinga is Oldest College in Kesinga Region Kalahandi District.
It is affiliated by ||Sambalpur University||
Art's and Science Both Hons Subject are Available Here, Narla and Muskuti college is the Nearest of Balsi.

Language and literature
The language spoken by the people of Kalahandi is the Kalahandia dialect of Oriya, locally known as Kalahandia . Local weekly newspapers such as Arjji and Kalahandi Express publish articles in standard Odia and Kalahandia language. Other languages include Kui, Bhatri (another dialect of Odia), Parji, Bhunjia, spoken by approximately 7000 Bhunjia Adivasis.

Areas of Balsi

Member pada
 Mandir Pada
 Sundhi Pada
 Upar Pada
 Gaud Pada
 Tarini Pada
 Harijan Pada
 Tulsi  pada

Village area of Balsi includes nearby sub-urban areas like Masanibandha, Station area, Kesinga road, Rengali, Rupra Road, Rayagada, Rampur, Narla, Vishakapatnam and Koraput.

References

Villages in Kalahandi district